William Wilson Saunders FRS (4 June 1809 – 13 September 1879) was a British insurance broker, entomologist and botanist.

Saunders was an underwriter at Lloyd's of London. He served as president of the Entomological Society from 1841 to 1842 and again from 1856 to 1857, was treasurer of the Linnean Society of London from 1861 to 1873 and was a Fellow of the Royal Society from 1853.

Saunders who lived at Reigate was also a well known horticulturalist. His entomological interests centred on Lepidoptera and Hymenoptera but his collection contained insects from all orders.

Saunder's Diptera collection contained many new species. These were described in a series of papers by Francis Walker entitled  Insecta Saundersiana.

"Nearly two thousand of my Coleoptera, and many hundreds of my butterflies, have been already described by various eminent naturalists, British and foreign; but a much larger number remains undescribed. Among those to whom science is most indebted for this laborious work, I must name Mr. F. P. Pascoe, late President of the Entomological Society of London, who had almost completed the classification and description of my large collection of Longicorn beetles (now in his possession), comprising more than a thousand species, of which at least nine hundred were previously undescribed and new to European cabinets. The remaining orders of insects, comprising probably more than two thousand species, are in the collection of Mr. William Wilson Saunders, who has caused the larger portion of them to be described by good entomologists. The Hymenoptera alone amounted to more than nine hundred species, among which were two hundred and eighty different kinds of ants, of which two hundred were new ". Alfred R. Wallace- The Malay Archipelago.

References
 Obit Nature, Volume 20, Number 518, 2 October 1879, 536–537.

External links
DEI Zalf Collection details.

1809 births
1879 deaths
Hymenopterists
English botanists
English lepidopterists
Fellows of the Royal Society
Fellows of the Linnean Society of London
Presidents of the Royal Entomological Society